The scrub blackbird (Dives warczewiczi) is a species of bird in the family Icteridae.

It is found in Ecuador and Peru and its natural habitats are subtropical or tropical moist lowland forests and heavily degraded former forest.

References

External links
Image at ADW

scrub blackbird
Birds of Ecuador
Birds of Peru
scrub blackbird
Taxonomy articles created by Polbot